In ethology and social science, male bonding or male friendship is the formation of close personal relationships, and patterns of friendship or cooperation between males.

In the context of human relationships, male bonding is used to describe friendship between men, or the way in which men befriend each other.  The expression is sometimes used synonymously with the word camaraderie.  The first widely noticed use of the term was in Men in Groups (1969; 2004) by anthropologist Lionel Tiger.

Male bonding can take place in various locations through shared activities or even just conversing.

See also
 Bachelor herd
 Bromance
 Cross-sex friendship
 Female bonding
 Gay men
 Homosociality
 Human bonding
 Mancation
 Man cave
 Mateship
 Social connection

Further reading
 Brehm, S.S., Miller, R.S., Perlman, D. & Campbell, S.M. (1992). Intimate relationships. Third edition, chapter 7: paragraph about "gender differences in same-sex friendships", pp. 212–213.
 Fanning, Patrick & McKay, Matthew. (1993). Being a friend: Making and keeping male friends. In Being a man: A guide to the new masculinity (pp. 108–125). Oakland, California: New Harbinger Publications, Inc.
 Garfinkel, Perry. (1992). "In a man's world: Father, son, brother, friend, and other roles men play." Berkeley, California: Ten Speed Press.
 Miller, Stuart. (1986). "Men & friendship." Bath, England: Gateway Books.
 Nardi, Peter. (1999). Gay Men's Friendships: Invincible Communities. U. of Chicago Press.
 Nardi, Peter. (1992). "Men's friendships" (Research on men and masculinities series). Newbury Park, California: Sage Publications.
 Pasick, Robert S. (1990). Friendship between men. In Meth, Richard L., Pasick, Robert S., et al., Men in therapy: The challenge of change (pp. 108–127). New York: The Guilford Press.
 Pasick, Robert S. (1992). Staying awake: The importance of friendship. In Awakening from the deep sleep: A powerful guide for courageous men (pp. 222–244). San Francisco, California: HarperSanFrancisco (A division of HarperCollins, Publishers).
 Wrangham, R. & Peterson, D. (1996). Demonic Males: Apes and the Origins of Human Violence. London: Bloomsbury Publishing.
 Lionel Tiger, Men in Groups, Random House 1969; Transaction, 2004
 Potvin, John. (2008) Material and Visual Cultures Beyond Male Bonding, 1870–1914. Hampshire England, Ashgate Publishing Limited

Friendship
Interpersonal relationships
Men's health